Riley Davies (born 17 September 2002), known professionally as ArrDee, is a British rapper. His debut mixtape, Pier Pressure, was released on 18 March 2022. Davies has received numerous accolades, including silver, gold and platinum plaques from the British Phonographic Industry (BPI) for his string of successful tracks.

Early life
Davies was born and raised in Brighton, England. On growing up in Brighton, Davies told Acclaim magazine, "Brighton is tight. Between my collective of people, I can almost one-hundred percent say we know everybody in Brighton. If we don’t, we know somebody that knows the ones we don’t know." "I was rapping at the age of 13, I used to run a studio in a one-bedroom flat." said Davies in an interview for HYPEBEAST Sole Mates. "At that time the music wasn’t going anywhere, but as I grew up I made connections through Instagram, I’d bunk the train to London, I’d be working and sleeping in studios in London for three days on end, so I had to get the network out there."

Career

2021-present: Breakthrough and Pier Pressure
Davies saw success being featured on the remix of Russ Millions and Tion Wayne's song "Body", which topped the charts in various countries including the UK. He then released the single "Oliver Twist", referencing the book by Charles Dickens, which peaked at number six on the UK Singles Chart

Davies's third solo single was "Flowers", which samples the track of the same name by Sweet Female Attitude and "Say My Name" by Destiny’s Child. It was released on 11 November  2021 and peaked at number 5 on the UK's Official Singles Chart Top 100, spending thirteen weeks in the Top 40, seventeen weeks in the Top 100, with seven of those weeks being in the chart's Top 10.

On 3 February 2022, Davies released his single, "War", featuring rapper Aitch. On the same day, it was announced that Davies's debut mixtape, titled Pier Pressure would be released 18 March 2022. "War" debuted at number 6 on the UK Official Singles Top 100 Chart and debuted at number 21 on the UK Official Singles Sales Chart Top 100 on 11 February 2022. On 4 March 2022, Davies released "Come & Go" as the next single from the album. "Come & Go" samples rapper Ironik's 2008 single "Stay With Me", which in turn samples "Written in the Stars" by Westlife.

Pier Pressure was released on 18 March 2022 to generally mixed reviews. The mixtape entered the UK Official Albums Chart Top 100 at number 2, placing at number 6 on the UK Official Album Download Charts Top 100 and debuted at number 1 on the UK Official Albums Streaming Chart Top 100 on 25 March 2022

In July 2022, Davies announced his next single, "Hello Mate". The track features a sample of "Do You Mind" by Kyla.

In January 2023, Davies released the single "Loser". On 9 March 2023, he released the single "Home For My Heart", a collaboration with singer Cat Burns, which saw Davies adopting a different sound to what he has released previously. The official music video, directed by Najeeb Tarazi, was released the same day. Actor and writer Kwame Kwei-Armah is credited as a lyricist on the single. After three days of release, the Official Charts Company predicted "Home for My Heart" would debut at number 36 on the UK Singles Top 100. "Home for my Heart" debuted at number 35 on the UK singles chart on 17 March 2023.

When asked about plans for his debut album, in an interview with Evening Standard, Davies said, "We’re definitely working on something special that we’re looking to put out later on in the year. It’s definitely a major project that is gonna [...] blow anybody away who’s ever heard of me [...] I wanted to make a song or songs that live [on]. I’ve got songs on my playlist that are 10 years old, that have got a message that speak to me or remind me of a feeling that will live with me forever.".

Davies makes his acting debut in the feature film, Tate: Ten Days of Blood, the sixth instalment of the Rise of the Footsoldier franchise.

Personal life 
Davies is a supporter of Chelsea F.C.

Filmography

As actor

Discography

Mixtapes

Singles

As lead artist

As featured artist

Other charted songs

References 

2000 births
Living people
21st-century British male musicians
21st-century British rappers
English hip hop musicians
English songwriters
English male rappers
Musicians from Brighton and Hove
People from Brighton
British male songwriters